Vəng is a village in the Kalbajar District of Azerbaijan. The Dadivank monastery is located in the village.

History 
The village was located in the Armenian-occupied territories surrounding Nagorno-Karabakh, coming under the control of ethnic Armenian forces during the First Nagorno-Karabakh War in the early 1990s. The village subsequently became part of the breakaway Republic of Artsakh as part of its Shahumyan Province, referred to as Dadivank. It was returned to Azerbaijan as part of the 2020 Nagorno-Karabakh ceasefire agreement. After the withdrawal of Armenian forces from the region, the Dadivank monastery in the village was placed under the protection of Russian peacekeeping forces.

Historical heritage sites 
Historical heritage sites in and around the village include the monastery of Dadivank from between the 4th and 13th centuries, khachkars from between the 11th and 13th centuries, a winepress, chapel and fresco from the 13th century, and the 14th-century monument of St. Dadi.

Demographics 
The village had 94 inhabitants in 2005, and 136 inhabitants in 2015.

Gallery

References

External links 

 

Populated places in Kalbajar District